This is a list of Melges 24 sailboat championships.

World Championships

References

Melges 24